The Black Band were resistance groups of anarchist and anarcho-syndicalist youth and young adults in the last years of the Weimar Republic.

History
In many German cities there were small groups of the youth organization Syndicalist-Anarchist Youth of Germany (SAJD) of the Free Workers' Union of Germany (FAUD) in the 1920s and 1930s. As a protection force against the growing National Socialist movement and communist disruptive activities, local clandestine anti-fascist organizations, known as black bands, were founded from 1929 onwards, mostly equipped with few weapons and explosives. They dressed in black uniform and were therefore controversial in the syndicalist and anarchist movement, since uniformity was mostly rejected there. The anti-fascist formations were criticized among older comrades because black clothing represented militarization and the street fighting could mean a relapse into the forms of political terrorism of the 19th century that had been overcome.

For a number of years the black band were able to prevent attacks by the National Socialists on assemblies and in working-class areas. "Everywhere the Black Band is not only stronger than the FAUD, but also stronger than the communist workers' armed forces" reported the Upper Silesian FAUD in 1930, which wanted to promote this. The black bands were able to mobilize an average of 300–400, at most 1500, participants for their meetings. Further centers of the black bands were the Rhineland, Central Germany and the Berlin area. The founders included Theodor Bennek, Paul Czakon, Alfons Pilarski (Upper Silesia), Walter Kaps (Berlin), Willi Paul (Kassel) and Gustav Doster (Darmstadt).

With the Machtergreifung (seizure of power) in 1933, the anarchist and anarcho-syndicalist youth organizations such as the SAJD disbanded themselves to avoid a ban and further arrests of their members, some of whom had been sent to the concentration camps. Those who had been spared either went into exile or formed an underground resistance together with older comrades. Funds were raised for imprisoned comrades, meetings were organized with other cities, courier trips were carried out and assistance was given to escape. Together with other left youth groups, slogans were painted on walls and pamphlets were printed. In the Rhineland the Gestapo uncovered the anarcho-syndicalist resistance around the turn of the year 1937 and arrested over 100 people. The young adults were taken into "protective custody", tortured and most of them convicted in 1937 for "preparing for high treason". Some were released in 1938, arrested again in 1939, sent to concentration camps and abused. Some of them died in custody. Some survivors were forced into SS special formations in 1944. Others had already gone into exile in Spain from 1936 to fight against the Nationalist faction in the Spanish Civil War.

References

Bibliography
 Helge Döhring: Schwarze Scharen. Anarcho-Syndikalistische Arbeiterwehr (1929–1933). Edition AV, Lich 2011, .
 Ulrich Linse, Die anarchistische und anarcho-syndikalistische Jugendbewegung 1919–1933. Dipa-Verlag, Frankfurt am Main 1976.
 Ulrich Linse, Die Schwarzen Scharen – eine antifaschistische Kampforganisation deutscher Anarchisten. In: Archiv für die Geschichte des Widerstandes und der Arbeit Bochum, Nr. 9 (1989), S. 47–66.
 Ulrich Klan, Dieter Nelles: Es lebt noch eine Flamme. Rheinische Anarcho-Syndikalist/-innen in der Weimarer Republik und im Faschismus. Trotzdem Verlag, Grafenau-Döffingen 1986.
 Rolf Theißen, Peter Walter, Johanna Wilhelms: Antiautoritäre Arbeiterbewegung im Faschismus. Anarcho-Syndikalistischer Widerstand an Rhein und Ruhr. Bd. I u. II, Meppen 1980.

External links
 Umsonst is dat nie – Arbeiterjugend und Nationalsozialismus: Documentary on YouTube about the Wuppertal black band during the Third Reich era
 Schwarze Scharen gegen die Finsternis. Audio-Podcast with Radio Chiflado
 Schwarze Scharen, Anarcho-Syndikalistische Arbeiterwehr 1929–33. Interview with Helge Döhring about his book of the same name. Radio Blau, Leipzig, February 2012.

1929 establishments in Germany
1933 disestablishments in Germany
Defunct anarchist militant groups
Paramilitary organisations of the Weimar Republic
Anti-fascist organisations in Germany
Anarcho-syndicalism